The  ( or ) is a regional transport cooperative that coordinates tickets and fares among all transport operators in the metropolitan area of Heilbronn in Germany. Besides the city of Heilbronn, the H3NV area encompasses the districts of Heilbronn and Hohenlohe. There are also overlappings with the districts of Schwäbisch Hall, Main-Tauber, Rhein-Neckar and Neckar-Odenwald.

External links 
 Official website of the H3NV (in German)

Companies based in Heilbronn
Transport in Heilbronn
1997 establishments in Germany
Transport companies established in 1997